In the theory of stochastic processes, the Karhunen–Loève theorem  (named after Kari Karhunen and Michel Loève), also known as the Kosambi–Karhunen–Loève theorem is a representation of a stochastic process as an infinite linear combination of orthogonal functions, analogous to a Fourier series representation of a function on a bounded interval. The transformation is also known as Hotelling transform and eigenvector transform, and is closely related to principal component analysis (PCA) technique widely used in image processing and in data analysis in many fields.

Stochastic processes given by infinite series of this form were first considered by Damodar Dharmananda Kosambi. The importance of the Karhunen–Loève theorem is that it yields the best such basis in the sense that it minimizes the total mean squared error.

In contrast to a Fourier series where the coefficients are fixed numbers and the expansion basis consists of sinusoidal functions (that is, sine and cosine functions), the coefficients in the Karhunen–Loève theorem are random variables and the expansion basis depends on the process. In fact, the orthogonal basis functions used in this representation are determined by the covariance function of the process. One can think that the Karhunen–Loève transform adapts to the process in order to produce the best possible basis for its expansion.

In the case of a centered stochastic process  (centered means  for all ) satisfying a technical continuity condition,  admits a decomposition

It is therefore sometimes said that the expansion is bi-orthogonal since the random coefficients  are orthogonal in the probability space while the deterministic functions  are orthogonal in the time domain. The general case of a process  that is not centered can be brought back to the case of a centered process by considering  which is a centered process.

Moreover, if the process is Gaussian, then the random variables  are Gaussian and stochastically independent. This result generalizes the Karhunen–Loève transform. In this case the expansion consists of sinusoidal functions.

The above expansion into uncorrelated random variables is also known as the Karhunen–Loève expansion or Karhunen–Loève decomposition. The empirical version (i.e., with the coefficients computed from a sample) is known as the Karhunen–Loève transform (KLT), principal component analysis, proper orthogonal decomposition (POD), empirical orthogonal functions (a term used in meteorology and geophysics), or the Hotelling transform.

Formulation 
Throughout this article, we will consider a square-integrable zero-mean random process  defined over a probability space  and indexed over a closed interval , with covariance function . We thus have: 

We associate to  a linear operator  defined in the following way:

Since  is a linear operator, it makes sense to talk about its eigenvalues λk and eigenfunctions , which are found solving the homogeneous Fredholm integral equation of the second kind

Statement of the theorem 
Theorem. Let  be a zero-mean square-integrable stochastic process defined over a probability space  and indexed over a closed and bounded interval [a, b], with continuous covariance function .

Furthermore, the random variables  have zero-mean, are uncorrelated and have variance λk

Note that by generalizations of Mercer's theorem we can replace the interval [a, b] with other compact spaces C and the Lebesgue measure on [a, b] with a Borel measure whose support is C.

Proof
The covariance function  satisfies the definition of a Mercer kernel.

The process  can be expanded in terms of the eigenfunctions  as:

We may then derive

Let 

Then:

which goes to 0 by Mercer's theorem.

Properties of the Karhunen–Loève transform

Special case: Gaussian distribution 
Since the limit in the mean of jointly Gaussian random variables is jointly Gaussian, and jointly Gaussian random (centered) variables are independent if and only if they are orthogonal, we can also conclude:

Theorem.  The variables  have a joint Gaussian distribution and are stochastically independent if the original process  is Gaussian.

In the Gaussian case, since the variables  are independent, we can say more:

almost surely.

The Karhunen–Loève transform decorrelates the process 

The Karhunen–Loève expansion minimizes the total mean square error 
In the introduction, we mentioned that the truncated Karhunen–Loeve expansion was the best approximation of the original process in the sense that it reduces the total mean-square error resulting of its truncation. Because of this property, it is often said that the KL transform optimally compacts the energy.

where

and we may approximate  by the finite sum

for some integer N.

Claim. Of all such approximations, the KL approximation is the one that minimizes the total mean square error (provided we have arranged the eigenvalues in decreasing order).

Explained variance 
An important observation is that since the random coefficients Zk of the KL expansion are uncorrelated, the Bienaymé formula asserts that the variance of Xt is simply the sum of the variances of the individual components of the sum:

Integrating over [a, b] and using the orthonormality of the ek, we obtain that the total variance of the process is:

In particular, the total variance of the N-truncated approximation is

As a result, the N-truncated expansion explains

of the variance; and if we are content with an approximation that explains, say, 95% of the variance, then we just have to determine an  such that

The Karhunen–Loève expansion has the minimum representation entropy property 
We may then define the representation entropy to be . That is, the KL-expansion has minimal representation entropy.

Proof:

Choose . Note that since  minimizes the mean squared error, we have that

 

Expanding the right hand size, we get:

 

 

 

 

This implies that:

Linear Karhunen–Loève approximations 
Consider a whole class of signals we want to approximate over the first  vectors of a basis. These signals are modeled as realizations of a random vector  of size . To optimize the approximation we design a basis that minimizes the average approximation error. The random vector  can be decomposed in an orthogonal basis

as follows:

where each

is a random variable. The approximation from the first  vectors of the basis is

The energy conservation in an orthogonal basis implies

This error is related to the covariance of  defined by

For any vector  we denote by  the covariance operator represented by this matrix,

The error  is therefore a sum of the last  coefficients of the covariance operator

The covariance operator  is Hermitian and Positive and is thus diagonalized in an orthogonal basis called a Karhunen–Loève basis. The following theorem states that a Karhunen–Loève basis is optimal for linear approximations.

Theorem (Optimality of Karhunen–Loève basis). Let  be a covariance operator. For all , the approximation error

is minimum if and only if

is a Karhunen–Loeve basis ordered by decreasing eigenvalues.

Non-Linear approximation in bases 
Linear approximations project the signal on M vectors a priori. The approximation can be made more precise by choosing the M orthogonal vectors depending on the signal properties. This section analyzes the general performance of these non-linear approximations. A signal  is approximated with M vectors selected adaptively in an orthonormal basis for 

Let  be the projection of f over M vectors whose indices are in :

The approximation error is the sum of the remaining coefficients

To minimize this error, the indices in  must correspond to the M vectors having the largest inner product amplitude

These are the vectors that best correlate f. They can thus be interpreted as the main features of f. The resulting error is necessarily smaller than the error of a linear approximation which selects the M approximation vectors independently of f. Let us sort

in decreasing order

The best non-linear approximation is

It can also be written as inner product thresholding:

with

The non-linear error is

this error goes quickly to zero as M increases, if the sorted values of  have a fast decay as k increases. This decay is quantified by computing the  norm of the signal inner products in B:

Theorem (decay of error).  If  with  then

and

Conversely, if  then

 for any .

Non-optimality of Karhunen–Loève bases 
To further illustrate the differences between linear and non-linear approximations, we study the decomposition of a simple non-Gaussian random vector in a Karhunen–Loève basis. Processes whose realizations have a random translation are stationary. The Karhunen–Loève basis is then a Fourier basis and we study its performance. To simplify the analysis, consider a random vector Y[n] of size N that is random shift modulo N of a deterministic signal f[n] of zero mean

The random shift P is uniformly distributed on [0, N − 1]:

Clearly

and

Hence

Since RY is N periodic, Y is a circular stationary random vector. The covariance operator is a circular convolution with RY and is therefore diagonalized in the discrete Fourier Karhunen–Loève basis

The power spectrum is Fourier transform of :

Example:  Consider an extreme case where . A theorem stated above guarantees that the Fourier Karhunen–Loève basis produces a smaller expected approximation error than a canonical basis of Diracs . Indeed, we do not know a priori the abscissa of the non-zero coefficients of Y, so there is no particular Dirac that is better adapted to perform the approximation. But the Fourier vectors cover the whole support of Y and thus absorb a part of the signal energy.

Selecting higher frequency Fourier coefficients yields a better mean-square approximation than choosing a priori a few Dirac vectors to perform the approximation. The situation is totally different for non-linear approximations. If  then the discrete Fourier basis is extremely inefficient because f and hence Y have an energy that is almost uniformly spread among all Fourier vectors. In contrast, since f has only two non-zero coefficients in the Dirac basis, a non-linear approximation of Y with  gives zero error.

Principal component analysis 

We have established the Karhunen–Loève theorem and derived a few properties thereof. We also noted that one hurdle in its application was the numerical cost of determining the eigenvalues and eigenfunctions of its covariance operator through the Fredholm integral equation of the second kind

However, when applied to a discrete and finite process , the problem takes a much simpler form and standard algebra can be used to carry out the calculations.

Note that a continuous process can also be sampled at N points in time in order to reduce the problem to a finite version.

We henceforth consider a random N-dimensional vector . As mentioned above, X could contain N samples of a signal but it can hold many more representations depending on the field of application. For instance it could be the answers to a survey or economic data in an econometrics analysis.

As in the continuous version, we assume that X is centered, otherwise we can let  (where  is the mean vector of X) which is centered.

Let us adapt the procedure to the discrete case.

Covariance matrix 
Recall that the main implication and difficulty of the KL transformation is computing the eigenvectors of the linear operator associated to the covariance function, which are given by the solutions to the integral equation written above.

Define Σ, the covariance matrix of X, as an N × N matrix whose elements are given by:

Rewriting the above integral equation to suit the discrete case, we observe that it turns into:

where  is an N-dimensional vector.

The integral equation thus reduces to a simple matrix eigenvalue problem, which explains why the PCA has such a broad domain of applications.

Let also  be the orthonormal matrix consisting of these eigenvectors:

Principal component transform 
It remains to perform the actual KL transformation, called the principal component transform in this case. Recall that the transform was found by expanding the process with respect to  the basis spanned by the eigenvectors of the covariance function. In this case, we hence have:

In a more compact form, the principal component transform of X is defined by:

As in the continuous case, we may reduce the dimensionality of the problem by truncating the sum at some  such that

where α is the explained variance threshold we wish to set.

We can also reduce the dimensionality through the use of multilevel dominant eigenvector estimation (MDEE).

Examples

The Wiener process 
There are numerous equivalent characterizations of the Wiener process which is a mathematical formalization of Brownian motion.  Here we regard it as the centered standard Gaussian process Wt with covariance function

We restrict the time domain to [a, b]=[0,1] without loss of generality.

The eigenvectors of the covariance kernel are easily determined.  These are

and the corresponding eigenvalues are

This gives the following representation of the Wiener process:

Theorem.  There is a sequence {Zi}i of independent Gaussian random variables with mean zero and variance 1 such that

Note that this representation is only valid for   On larger intervals, the increments are not independent.  As stated in the theorem, convergence is in the L2 norm and uniform in t.

The Brownian bridge 
Similarly the Brownian bridge  which is a stochastic process with covariance function

can be represented as the series

Applications 

Adaptive optics systems sometimes use K–L functions to reconstruct wave-front phase information (Dai 1996, JOSA A).
Karhunen–Loève expansion is closely related to the Singular Value Decomposition. The latter has myriad applications in image processing, radar, seismology, and the like. If one has independent vector observations from a vector valued stochastic process then the left singular vectors are maximum likelihood estimates of the ensemble KL expansion.

Applications in signal estimation and detection

Detection of a known continuous signal S(t)
In communication, we usually have to decide whether a signal from a noisy channel contains valuable information. The following hypothesis testing is used for detecting continuous signal s(t) from channel output X(t), N(t) is the channel noise, which is usually assumed zero mean Gaussian process with correlation function

Signal detection  in white noise
When the channel noise is white, its correlation function is

and it has constant power spectrum density. In physically practical channel, the noise power is finite, so:

Then the noise correlation function is sinc function with zeros at  Since are uncorrelated and gaussian, they are independent. Thus we can take samples from X(t) with time spacing

Let . We have a total of  i.i.d observations  to develop the likelihood-ratio test.  Define signal , the problem becomes,

The log-likelihood ratio

As , let:

Then G is the test statistics and the Neyman–Pearson optimum detector is

As G is Gaussian, we can characterize it by finding its mean and variances. Then we get

where

is the signal energy.

The false alarm error

And the probability of detection:

where Φ is the cdf of standard normal, or Gaussian, variable.

Signal detection in colored noise 
When N(t) is colored (correlated in time) Gaussian noise  with zero mean and covariance function   we cannot sample independent discrete observations by evenly spacing the time. Instead, we can use K–L expansion to decorrelate the noise process and get independent Gaussian observation 'samples'.  The K–L expansion of N(t):

where  and the orthonormal bases  are generated by kernel , i.e., solution to

Do the expansion:

where , then

under H and  under K. Let , we have

 are independent Gaussian r.v's with variance 

under H:  are independent Gaussian r.v's. 

under K:  are independent Gaussian r.v's. 

Hence, the log-LR is given by

and the optimum detector is

Define

then

How to find k(t)
Since

k(t) is the solution to

If N(t)is wide-sense stationary,

which is known as the Wiener–Hopf equation. The equation can be solved by taking fourier transform, but not practically realizable since infinite spectrum needs spatial factorization. A special case which is easy to calculate k(t) is white Gaussian noise.

The corresponding impulse response is h(t) = k(T − t) = CS(T − t). Let C = 1, this is just the result we arrived at in previous section for detecting of signal in white noise.

Test threshold for Neyman–Pearson detector
Since X(t) is a Gaussian process,

is a Gaussian random variable that can be characterized by its mean and variance.

Hence, we obtain the distributions of H and K:

The false alarm error is

So the test threshold for the Neyman–Pearson optimum detector is

Its power of detection is

When the noise is white Gaussian process, the signal power is

Prewhitening
For some type of colored noise, a typical practise is to add a prewhitening filter before the matched filter to transform the colored noise into white noise. For example, N(t) is a wide-sense stationary colored noise with correlation function

The transfer function of prewhitening filter is

Detection of a Gaussian random signal in Additive white Gaussian noise (AWGN)
When the signal we want to detect from the noisy channel is also random, for example, a white Gaussian process X(t), we can still implement K–L expansion to get independent sequence of observation. In this case, the detection problem is described as follows:

X(t) is a random process with correlation function 

The K–L expansion of X(t) is

where

So 's are independent sequence of r.v's with zero mean and variance .

where

As N(t) is Gaussian white noise, 's are i.i.d sequence of r.v with zero mean and variance , then the problem is simplified as follows,

The Neyman–Pearson optimal test:

so the log-likelihood ratio is

Since

is just the minimum-mean-square estimate of  given 's,

K–L expansion has the following property:  If

where

then

So let

Noncausal filter Q(t,s) can be used to get the estimate through

By orthogonality principle, Q(t,s) satisfies

However, for practical reasons, it's necessary to further derive the causal filter h(t,s), where h(t,s) = 0 for s > t, to get estimate . Specifically,

See also
Principal component analysis
Polynomial chaos
Reproducing kernel Hilbert space
Mercer's theorem

Notes

References
 

 
 
 
 {{cite book
|first1=M.
|last1=Loève
|title=Probability theory. Vol. II, 4th ed.
|series=Graduate Texts in Mathematics
|volume=46
|publisher=Springer-Verlag
|year=1978
|isbn=978-0-387-90262-3
}}
 
Wu B., Zhu J., Najm F.(2005) "A Non-parametric Approach for Dynamic Range Estimation of Nonlinear Systems". In Proceedings of Design Automation Conference(841-844) 2005
Wu B., Zhu J., Najm F.(2006) "Dynamic Range Estimation". IEEE Transactions on Computer-Aided Design of Integrated Circuits and Systems, Vol. 25 Issue:9 (1618–1636) 2006
 

External links
 Mathematica KarhunenLoeveDecomposition function.
 E161: Computer Image Processing and Analysis'' notes by Pr. Ruye Wang at Harvey Mudd College 

Probability theorems
Signal estimation
Theorems in statistics

fr:Transformée de Karhunen-Loève